Viktor Viktorovich Zozulin (10 October 1944 – 16 August 2022) was a Russian film and theatre actor.

Biography 
Zozulin attended the Boris Shchukin Theatre Institute, which he had finished with honours. He then earned some invitations to at least seven theaters. Zozulin had played as Calaf in the play Princess Turandot, which was considered one of his first known roles. He worked in Vakhtangov Theatre for more than 55 years. He had played numerous roles during his film and theatre career. Zozulin was a recipient of the Honored Artist of the RSFSR. He was also honored with the title of the People's Artist of Russia.

He was famous for playing radio technician Kostya, the friend of one of the main characters of Operation Y and Shurik's Other Adventures.

Zozulin died of illness in August 2022, at the age of 77.

References

External links 

 
Rotten Tomatoes profile
Viktor Zozulin at KinoPoisk

1944 births
2022 deaths
Soviet male stage actors
Soviet male film actors
Russian male stage actors
Russian male film actors
20th-century Russian male actors
21st-century Russian male actors
Male actors from Moscow
People's Artists of Russia
Honored Artists of the RSFSR